Augusto Conte Mac Donell (4 May 1926 – 5 February 1992) was an Argentine lawyer, human rights activist and politician. He was a leader of the Christian Democratic Party, and co-founded and led the Center for Legal and Social Studies (CELS). He was a defender of human rights.

Career
In 1955, he was appointed Undersecretary of Defense by the dictatorial régime that took power following the September 1955 coup d'état, which ousted Juan Perón.

On 7 July 1976, during the dictatorship of the National Reorganization Process, his son Augusto María Conte Mac Donell disappeared while he was in military service. Conte Mac Donell's years-long and ultimately unsuccessful search for his son led him becoming a human rights defender.

In 1963, Conte Mac Donell was elected vice president of the Christian Democratic Party.

He wrote many articles, perhaps most importantly one in which he developed the theory of global parallelism, which he cowrote with Emilio Mignone, and presented at the Colloquium of Paris.

Following the return of democracy in 1983, he was elected to the National Chamber of Deputies as a representative of Buenos Aires on the Christian Democratic Party list. He became the only member of the party to be elected to Congress in that election. In 1987, shortly before his term expired, he resigned from his seat and was succeded by Ángel Atilio J. Bruno.

He died by suicide on 5 February 1992.

Recognition
The Office of the United Nations High Commissioner for Human Rights held a ceremony to commemorate the events that took place at the former ESMA, with Horacio Verbitsky (journalist and president of CELS); Estela de Carlotto (president of the Grandmothers of the Plaza de Mayo), Marta Vázquez (member of Mothers Línea Fundadora), Graciela Lois (supporter of Relatives of Disappeared and Detained for Political Reasons), and Aldo Etchegoyen (co-president of the Permanent Assembly for Human Rights).

References

1926 births
20th-century Argentine lawyers
20th-century Argentine politicians
Argentine human rights activists
Christian Democratic Party (Argentina) politicians
Members of the Argentine Chamber of Deputies elected in Buenos Aires
Suicides in Argentina
1992 suicides